The Henry R. Koen Forest Service Building is a historic federal government office building at 605 West Main Street in Russellville, Arkansas.  It is two story stone and frame structure, built in 1939 by crews of the Civilian Conservation Corps.  The building is distinctive urban adaptation of the Rustic style for which the CCC became well known.  Originally built to house both the main offices of the Ozark-St. Francis National Forest and local CCC administrators, it is now used exclusively by the former.

The building was listed on the National Register of Historic Places in 1989.

See also
National Register of Historic Places listings in Pope County, Arkansas

References

Government buildings on the National Register of Historic Places in Arkansas
Government buildings completed in 1939
Buildings and structures in Russellville, Arkansas
Ozark–St. Francis National Forest
Civilian Conservation Corps in Arkansas
1939 establishments in Arkansas
United States Forest Service architecture
Rustic architecture in Arkansas